Mohamed Sedki Sulayman (1919 – 28 March 1996) was an Egyptian politician and Prime Minister of Egypt from 10 September 1966 to 19 June 1967.

Between 1962 and 1966, he was the minister supervising the building of the Aswan High Dam.

Six-Day War
During Sulayman's last month as Prime Minister, the Six-Day War was fought from 5 to 10 June 1967 by Israel and the states of Egypt (known then as the United Arab Republic), Jordan, and Syria. The outcome was a decisive Israeli victory. Israel took effective control of the Gaza Strip and the Sinai Peninsula from Egypt, the West Bank from Jordan, and the Golan Heights from Syria.

Central Audit Organisation
Muhammed Sedki Sulayman was the head of the Central Audit Organisation (CAO) of Egypt between 15 November 1971 and 17 January 1978.

Death
Sulayman died on 28 March 1996.

References

External links

1919 births
1996 deaths
20th-century prime ministers of Egypt
Arab Socialist Union (Egypt) politicians
Politicians from Alexandria
Electricity and Energy ministers of Egypt